Scott Heather (born September 14, 1975) is an American college baseball coach, currently serving as head coach of the Bucknell Bison baseball program.  He was named to that position prior to the 2013 season.

Heather began his playing career at Arizona Western, and completed his eligibility at Arkansas.  He played on season with the independent Duluth–Superior Dukes and served as a student assistant at Arkansas in 1999.  For the next five seasons, he worked as an assistant coach at Arkansas–Fort Smith, then a junior college.  In 2005, Heather joined the staff at Bucknell, working with pitchers.  He was elevated to the head coaching position after longtime head coach Gene Depew retired.  After claiming a share of the conference regular season title and the top seed in the 2014 Patriot League baseball tournament, Heather was named Patriot League Coach of the Year in 2014.

Head coaching record
The following table shows Heather's record as a head coach.

See also
 List of current NCAA Division I baseball coaches

References

External links

Living people
1975 births
Arizona Western Matadors baseball players
Arkansas Razorbacks baseball coaches
Arkansas Razorbacks baseball players
Bucknell Bison baseball coaches
Duluth-Superior Dukes players
Junior college baseball coaches in the United States
Baseball coaches from Minnesota
Baseball players from Saint Paul, Minnesota